Fort Scott USD 234 is a public unified school district headquartered in Fort Scott, Kansas, United States.  The district includes the communities of Fort Scott, Fulton, Devon, Garland, Hammond, Pawnee Station,  and nearby rural areas.

Schools
The school district operates the following schools:
 Fort Scott High School
 Fort Scott Middle School
 Eugene Ware Elementary School
 Winfield Scott Elementary School
 Fort Scott Preschool Center

See also
 Kansas State Department of Education
 Kansas State High School Activities Association
 List of high schools in Kansas
 List of unified school districts in Kansas

References

External links
 

School districts in Kansas